Pinvidic is a surname, and may refer to;

Pinvidic derives from pinvidik which means rich in Breton.

Jérémy Pinvidic French professional football player
Brant Pinvidic Canadian-American television executive

Breton-language surnames